In enzymology, a NADPH dehydrogenase (quinone) is an enzyme that catalyzes the chemical reaction

NADPH + H+ + acceptor  NADP+ + reduced acceptor

The 3 substrates of this enzyme are NADPH, H+, and acceptor, whereas its two products are NADP+ and reduced acceptor.

This enzyme belongs to the family of oxidoreductases, specifically those acting on NADH or NADPH with other acceptors.  The systematic name of this enzyme class is NADPH:(quinone-acceptor) oxidoreductase. Other names in common use include reduced nicotinamide adenine dinucleotide phosphate (quinone), dehydrogenase, NADPH oxidase, and NADPH2 dehydrogenase (quinone).  It has 2 cofactors: FAD,  and Flavoprotein.  Several compounds are known to inhibit this enzyme, including Folate, and Dicumarol.

Structural studies
As of late 2007, only one structure has been solved for this class of enzymes, with the PDB accession code .

See also 
 NdhF

References

 

EC 1.6.5
NADPH-dependent enzymes
Flavoproteins
Enzymes of known structure